Yerson Gutiérrez Cuenca (born 20 January 1994) is a Colombian footballer who currently plays as a forward for Marathón.

Career statistics

Club

Notes

References

1994 births
Living people
Colombian footballers
Colombian expatriate footballers
Association football forwards
América de Cali footballers
Atlético F.C. footballers
C.D. Honduras Progreso players
C.D. Marathón players
Categoría Primera B players
Liga Nacional de Fútbol Profesional de Honduras players
Colombian expatriate sportspeople in Ecuador
Expatriate footballers in Ecuador
Colombian expatriate sportspeople in Honduras
Expatriate footballers in Honduras
Sportspeople from Valle del Cauca Department